Bonnie Shimko is an American author of five young adult novels.

Biography
After thirty-three years of teaching second grade, Bonnie Shimko retired and began writing.  Her first novel, Letters in the Attic, won a Lambda Literary Award for children's/young adult fiction in 2002.  Shimko lives in Plattsburgh, New York.

Works
Letters in the Attic (2002)
Kat's Promise (2006)
The Private Thoughts of Amelia E. Rye  (2010)
You Know What You Have to Do   (2013)
''Stony Lonesome Road  (2015)

References

External links 

 Official website

American children's writers
Lambda Literary Award for Children's and Young Adult Literature winners
Living people
Year of birth missing (living people)
People from Plattsburgh, New York
Writers from New York (state)
American women children's writers
Schoolteachers from New York (state)
American women educators
21st-century American women